Dromara is a village, townland (of 242 acres) and civil parish in County Down, Northern Ireland. It is situated in Dromara (civil parish) and the historic barony of Iveagh Lower, Lower Half. In the 2011 Census it had a population of 1,006 people.

History
There have been references to a church at Dromara since about 1306. Earlier anglicised names for the church and townland include Drummeragh, Drumaragh and Drumara—these are likely derived from Druim mBearach (modern Irish Droim mBearach) meaning "ridge of heifers". Saint John's Church now occupies the site of the original church. Dromara eventually became a small mill village and although many of its buildings date from the early 19th century, the street pattern suggests that the settlement has a much earlier history. It used to have its own court and market house and a market place at the road junction in the middle of the village.

Facilities
Facilities in the village include Dromara Primary School, two churches (St John's Church of Ireland and Dromara Second Presbyterian Church).

Places of interest
Legannany Dolmen, a prehistoric three legged 'giants grave' is just outside the village.
Binder's Cove – a rediscovered souterrain near Finnis, Dromara. Finnis Souterrain (a scheduled ancient monument) is known locally as 'Binders Cove'. Although the first recorded discovery of Binder's Cove was in the 18th century, it actually dates back to the 9th century. Souterrains were "underground stone lined tunnels". Because there was much clann feuding and raiding from foreign invaders such as the Vikings in the Early Christian period, souterrains are thought to have been places of refuge for the occupants of the monastery or its attached enclosure. They may also have been 'safes' where valuable gold and silver religious artefacts were kept. As they were dark, cold and dry, food might also have been stored in them.

Sport
Dromara Village F.C. play association football in the Northern Amateur Football League.

People
Harry Ferguson, inventor of the modern gearbox and the 'Ferguson' Tractor, was born near Dromara.
Hugh Hanna, nicknamed 'Roaring Hanna', Presbyterian minister, born in Dromara in 1821.

Demography
On Census day (27 March 2011) there were 1,006 people living in Dromara. Of these:
25.45% were aged under 16 years and 12.03 were aged 65 and over
48.01% of the population were male and 51.99% were female
21.77% were from a Catholic background and 68.99% were from a Protestant and Other Christian background
4.45% of people aged 16–74 were unemployed

See also
Dromara (civil parish)
Market Houses in Northern Ireland
List of civil parishes of County Down

References

External links
Historical Walk Through Dromore
Culture Northern Ireland

Villages in County Down
Townlands of County Down
Civil parish of Dromara